A caravan city is a city located on and deriving its prosperity from its location on a major trans-desert trade route. The term is believed to have been coined by the great scholar of antiquity, Michael Rostovtzeff, for his work O Blijnem Vostoke, published in English for the first time by the Clarendon Press in 1932 as Caravan Cities. The English translation of the work dealt principally with Petra, Jerash, Palmyra and Dura in the "near east", after Rhodes, Cyprus and Mycenaean Greece were removed from the translation as not being caravan cities. Dura, too, has been later considered to be more than a caravan city.

Other caravan cities include Aroer in Jordan, Hatra in Iraq, Oualata in Mauritania, Damascus in Syria, and Samarkand in Uzbekistan.

The caravan cities of the Near East declined as the small trade states between the Roman and Persian empires were gradually absorbed by the two, and the "wall mentality" became dominant, that is, construction of defensive systems (Roman limes and Persian defense lines) and implementation of trade through a single point, the city of Nisibis.

See also
Caravanserai
Silk road

References

Further reading
Sommer, Michael. Hatra. History and culture of a caravan city in Roman-Parthian Mesopotamia. Mainz, 2003. 

Types of cities
Silk Road
Trade routes